Stéphane Simian and Kenny Thorne were the defending champions, but did not participate this year.

Sébastien Lareau and Jeff Tarango won the title, defeating Joshua Eagle and Andrew Florent 6–3, 6–2 in the final.

Seeds 

  Mark Keil /  Peter Nyborg (first round)
  Hendrik Jan Davids /  Stephen Noteboom (semifinals)
  Emanuel Couto /  João Cunha e Silva (quarterfinals)
  Joshua Eagle /  Andrew Florent (final)

Draw

Draw

References

External links 
 Draw

Seoul Open
1995 ATP Tour
1995 Seoul Open